is a retired Japanese mixed martial artist, judoka and submission grappler, who mainly competed in the Featherweight division. A professional competitor since 2005, Omigawa competed in the UFC, PRIDE, Cage Rage, World Victory Road, DREAM, DEEP, and Shooto.

Background
Omigawa is from Ibaraki Prefecture, Japan and began training in judo when he was in elementary school. He attended Tsuchiuranichidai High School with fellow mixed martial artists Hayato Sakurai and Kazuyuki Miyata. Omigawa's grandfather, who he was named after, died the day before his graduation. Omigawa attended the International Budo University in the Chiba Prefecture of Japan.

Omigawa has won various judo tournaments and medals during his career. He received the silver medal at the 2001 Asian Judo Championships in Ulaanbaatar, Mongolia, and earned a bronze medal at the 2002 Asian Games in Busan, South Korea all for the 66 kg weight class division.

Early mixed martial arts career
Omigawa made his professional mixed martial arts debut in 2005 against future UFC veteran Aaron Riley at PRIDE Bushido 7. Omigawa and Riley traded punches before Omigawa was knocked out by a head kick six minutes into the first round. Omigawa then fought for the British Cage Rage organization against future two-time K-1 HERO'S Middleweight Champion Gesias Calvacante. He again lost this fight by knockout, this time from an overhand right.

After a majority decision loss to Kazunori Yokota brought Omigawa's record to 1-4, he then strung together three consecutive wins in the DEEP organization, before making his UFC debut at UFC 76 against Matt Wiman. He lost this fight via unanimous decision. Omigawa then fought again for the UFC at UFC Fight Night: Swick vs Burkman against Thiago Tavares and lost again via unanimous decision.

After cutting down to the Featherweight division, Omigawa's recognition and career began to take off. Though he lost his division debut against future WEC and UFC veteran Jung Chan-Sung, Omigawa made a resurgence when he entered the Sengoku Featherweight Grand Prix tournament promoted by World Victory Road. As a heavy underdog he defeated the likes of LC Davis via unanimous decision and Nam Phan via TKO. In the semi-final he faced then-undefeated Pancrase Featherweight Champion and future Sengoku Featherweight Champion Marlon Sandro. This fight was originally ruled as a majority draw before Omigawa was awarded the victory by split decision. This brought Omigawa to the final of the tournament against Masanori Kanehara (the semi-finalist loser) who stood in for Hatsu Hioki as Hioki could not continue to compete. Omigawa lost by a close split decision against Kanehara but in return earned him the recognition as a strong Featherweight.

After the tournament Omigawa continued to earn a spot as a world top five Featherweight, defeating the likes of Hatsu Hioki via a controversial split decision, Hiroyuki Takaya via TKO at Dynamite!! 2009, Micah Miller, and Cole Escovedo via armbar.

Return to the UFC
The 12-8-1 Omigawa re-signed with the UFC in the Featherweight division and he faced then-undefeated Chad Mendes on February 5, 2011 at UFC 126.  He lost the fight via unanimous decision.

Omigawa was defeated by Darren Elkins via unanimous decision on June 11, 2011 at UFC 131.  The decision was considered controversial, and despite the loss, UFC president Dana White stated on his Twitter account that both fighters would be paid a win bonus.

Omigawa faced British fighter Jason Young on November 5, 2011 at UFC 138 and won the fight via unanimous decision.

Omigawa next faced former Jungle Fight Lightweight Champion Yuri Alcântara on January 14, 2012 at UFC 142. Omigawa lost the fight via unanimous decision.

Omigawa fought fellow judoka Manny Gamburyan on August 4, 2012 at UFC on FOX 4. He lost via unanimous decision.
After back-to-back losses in the UFC, Omigawa was released from the promotion yet again.

Post-UFC
Omigawa fought at DREAM 18 against Tatsuya Kawajiri on New Year's Eve 2012. Omigawa lost via unanimous decision. The loss puts Omigawa at 1-6 in his last seven fights, all of which have gone to a decision.

Road FC
In May 2013, it was announced that Omigawa had signed with Korea's ROAD FC and would debut against fellow judo practitioner, Bae Young Kwon at Road FC 12. After a back and forth fight, Omigawa lost a controversial decision.

Shootboxing
Bringing his boxing and judo skills to the kickboxing/grappling hybrid sport of shootboxing, Omigawa entered the 2013 –65 kg S-Cup held at Shoot Boxing Battle Summit Ground Zero Tokyo 2013 in Tokyo, Japan on November 15, 2013. After defeating Yuki Hiroshi Kimaya by unanimous decision in the quarter-finals, he then faced fellow mixed martial artist "Wicky" Akiyo Nishiura in the semis. The fight was ruled a majority draw after the regulation three rounds and so went to an extension round to produce a winner, after which Omigawa was given the nod by all three judges. In the tournament final, he fell victim to a flying knee from Hiroaki Suzuki, losing by knockout in round two.

Retirement Bout 
After winning the next 6 bouts after his loss in Road FC, mostly fighting under the banner of DEEP, Omigawa announced that he would be facing Daisuke Nakamura in his retirement bout at DEEP 106 on February 26, 2022. He lost the bout the fight via armbar in the third and retired afterwards.

Championships and accomplishments

Kickboxing
World Shoot Boxing Association
2013 65 kg S-Cup Runner-up

Mixed martial arts
Sengoku Raiden Championships
2009 Sengoku Featherweight Grand Prix Runner Up

Kickboxing record

|-  style="background:#fbb;"
| 2013-11-15 || Loss ||align=left| Hiroaki Suzuki || Shoot Boxing Battle Summit Ground Zero Tokyo 2013, Final || Tokyo, Japan || KO (right flying knee) || 2 || || 2-1
|-
! style=background:white colspan=9 |
|-  style="background:#cfc;"
| 2013-11-15 || Win ||align=left| Akiyo Nishiura || Shoot Boxing Battle Summit Ground Zero Tokyo 2013, Semi Finals || Tokyo, Japan || Extension round decision (unanimous) || 4 || 3:00 || 2-0
|-  style="background:#cfc;"
| 2013-11-15 || Win ||align=left| Yuki Hiroshi Kimaya || Shoot Boxing Battle Summit Ground Zero Tokyo 2013, Quarter Finals || Tokyo, Japan || Decision (unanimous) || 3 || 3:00 || 1-0
|-
| colspan=9 | Legend:

Mixed martial arts record

|-
| Loss
| align=center| 19–15–1
| Daisuke Nakamura
| Submission (armbar)
| DEEP 106 Impact
| 
| align=center| 3
| align=center| 0:51
| Tokyo, Japan
| 
|-
| Win
| align=center| 19–14–1
| Akihiko Mouri
| KO (punch)
| DEEP 92 Impact
| 
| align=center| 3
| align=center| 1:49
| Tokyo, Japan
| 
|-
| Win
| align=center| 18–14–1
| Yuka Ohara
| Submission (head and arm choke)
| DEEP 90 Impact
| 
| align=center| 2
| align=center| 2:03
| Tokyo, Japan
|
|-
| Win
| align=center| 17–14–1
| Teddy Violet
| Decision (split)
| WSOF Global Championship 2
| 
| align=center| 3
| align=center| 5:00
| Tokyo, Japan
|
|-
| Win
| align=center| 16–14–1
| Yoshifumi Nakamura
| Decision (unanimous)
| Grandslam MMA 3: Way of the Cage
| 
| align=center| 3
| align=center| 5:00
| Tokyo, Japan
|
|-
| Win
| align=center| 15–14–1
| Kosuke Umeda
| Submission (guillotine choke)
| DEEP Cage Impact 2015
| 
| align=center| 1
| align=center| 1:26
| Tokyo, Japan
| 
|-
| Win
| align=center| 14–14–1
| Peter Cepeda 
| Submission (straight armbar)
| DEEP 68 Impact
| 
| align=center| 1
| align=center| 1:02
| Tokyo, Japan
| 
|-
| Loss
| align=center| 13–14–1
| Bae Young Kwon
| Decision (unanimous)
| Road FC 012
| 
| align=center| 2
| align=center| 5:00
| Gwandong, South Korea
| 
|-
| Loss
| align=center| 13–13–1
| Tatsuya Kawajiri
| Decision (unanimous)
| DREAM 18
| 
| align=center| 3
| align=center| 5:00
| Tokyo, Japan
| 
|-
| Loss
| align=center| 13–12–1
| Manvel Gamburyan
| Decision (unanimous)
| UFC on Fox: Shogun vs. Vera
| 
| align=center| 3
| align=center| 5:00
| Los Angeles, California, United States
| 
|-
| Loss
| align=center| 13–11–1
| Iuri Alcântara
| Decision (unanimous)
| UFC 142
| 
| align=center| 3
| align=center| 5:00
| Rio de Janeiro, Brazil
| 
|-
| Win
| align=center| 13–10–1
| Jason Young
| Decision (unanimous)
| UFC 138
| 
| align=center| 3
| align=center| 5:00
| Birmingham, England
| 
|-
| Loss
| align=center| 
| Darren Elkins
| Decision (unanimous)
| UFC 131
| 
| align=center| 3
| align=center| 5:00
| Vancouver, British Columbia, Canada
| 
|-
| Loss
| align=center| 12–9–1
| Chad Mendes
| Decision (unanimous)
| UFC 126
| 
| align=center| 3
| align=center| 5:00
| Las Vegas, Nevada, United States
| 
|-
| Win
| align=center| 12–8–1
| Cole Escovedo
| Submission (inverted armbar)
| DREAM 16
| 
| align=center| 1
| align=center| 2:30
| Nagoya, Japan
| 
|-
| Win
| align=center| 11–8–1
| Young Sam Jung
| Submission (guillotine choke)
| DREAM 15
| 
| align=center| 1
| align=center| 7:31
| Saitama, Japan
| 
|-
| Win
| align=center| 10–8–1
| Micah Miller
| Decision (unanimous)
| Astra: Yoshida's Farewell
| 
| align=center| 3
| align=center| 5:00
| Tokyo, Japan
| 
|-
| Win
| align=center| 9–8–1
| Hiroyuki Takaya
| TKO (punches)
| Dynamite!! The Power of Courage 2009
| 
| align=center| 1
| align=center| 2:54
| Saitama, Japan
| 
|-
| Win
| align=center| 8–8–1
| Hatsu Hioki
| Decision (split)
| World Victory Road Presents: Sengoku 11
| 
| align=center| 3
| align=center| 5:00
| Tokyo, Japan
| 
|-
| Loss
| align=center| 7–8–1
| Masanori Kanehara
| Decision (split)
| rowspan=2|World Victory Road Presents: Sengoku 9
| rowspan=2|
| align=center| 3
| align=center| 5:00
| rowspan=2|Saitama, Japan
| 
|-
| Win
| align=center| 7–7–1
| Marlon Sandro
| Decision (split)
| align=center| 3
| align=center| 5:00
| 
|-
| Win
| align=center| 6–7–1
| Nam Phan
| TKO (punches)
| World Victory Road Presents: Sengoku 8
| 
| align=center| 1
| align=center| 4:52
| Tokyo, Japan
| 
|-
| Win
| align=center| 5–7–1
| LC Davis
| Decision (unanimous)
| World Victory Road Presents: Sengoku 7
| 
| align=center| 3
| align=center| 5:00
| Tokyo, Japan
| 
|-
| Draw
| align=center| 4–7–1
| Shintaro Ishiwatari
| Draw
| Shooto: Shooto Tradition 5
| 
| align=center| 2
| align=center| 5:00
| Tokyo, Japan
| 
|-
| Loss
| align=center| 4–7
| Jung Chan-Sung
| Decision (unanimous)
| Deep: Gladiator
| 
| align=center| 2
| align=center| 5:00
| Okayama, Japan
| 
|-
| Loss
| align=center| 4–6
| Thiago Tavares
| Decision (unanimous)
| UFC Fight Night: Swick vs Burkman
| 
| align=center| 3
| align=center| 5:00
| Las Vegas, Nevada, United States
| 
|-
| Loss
| align=center| 4–5
| Matt Wiman
| Decision (unanimous)
| UFC 76
| 
| align=center| 3
| align=center| 5:00
| Anaheim, California, United States
| 
|-
| Win
| align=center| 4–4
| Naoki Matsushita
| TKO (punches)
| Deep: 29 Impact
| 
| align=center| 2
| align=center| 1:17
| Tokyo, Japan
| 
|-
| Win
| align=center| 3–4
| Woo Jin Eoh
| TKO (punch)
| Deep: 28 Impact
| 
| align=center| 1
| align=center| 4:25
| Tokyo, Japan
| 
|-
| Win
| align=center| 2–4
| Takaaki Aoki
| Decision (unanimous)
| Deep: clubDeep Tokyo: Future King Tournament 2006
| 
| align=center| 2
| align=center| 5:00
| Tokyo, Japan
| 
|-
| Loss
| align=center| 1–4
| Kazunori Yokota
| Decision (majority)
| Deep: 26 Impact
| 
| align=center| 3
| align=center| 5:00
| Tokyo, Japan
| 
|-
| Loss
| align=center| 1–3
| Yoshihiro Tomioka
| Decision (unanimous)
| Deep: clubDeep Toyama: Barbarian Festival 4
| 
| align=center| 3
| align=center| 5:00
| Toyama, Toyama, Japan
| 
|-
| Win
| align=center| 1–2
| Jason Chambers
| Decision (split)
| ICON Sport: Lawler vs. Niko 2
| 
| align=center| 3
| align=center| 5:00
| Honolulu, Hawaii, United States
| 
|-
| Loss
| align=center| 0–2
| Gesias Cavalcante
| KO (punches)
| Cage Rage 14
| 
| align=center| 1
| align=center| 0:49
| London, England
| 
|-
| Loss
| align=center| 0–1
| Aaron Riley
| KO (head kick)
| PRIDE: Bushido 7
| 
| align=center| 1
| align=center| 6:00
| Tokyo, Japan
|

Submission grappling record
KO PUNCHES
|- style="text-align:center; background:#f0f0f0;"
| style="border-style:none none solid solid; "|Result
| style="border-style:none none solid solid; "|Opponent
| style="border-style:none none solid solid; "|Method
| style="border-style:none none solid solid; "|Event
| style="border-style:none none solid solid; "|Date
| style="border-style:none none solid solid; "|Round
| style="border-style:none none solid solid; "|Time
| style="border-style:none none solid solid; "|Notes
|-
|Draw|| Thomas Mietz || Draw || Quintet Fight Night 2 || February 3, 2019 || 1|| 10:00||
|-
|Draw|| Daisuke Nakamura || Draw || Quintet || April 11, 2018|| 1|| 10:00||

References

External links

Official UFC Profile
MMA record

Japanese male judoka
Japanese male mixed martial artists
Featherweight mixed martial artists
Mixed martial artists utilizing judo
Mixed martial artists utilizing shootboxing
1975 births
Living people
Asian Games medalists in judo
Japanese male kickboxers
Welterweight kickboxers
Judoka at the 2002 Asian Games
Asian Games bronze medalists for Japan
Medalists at the 2002 Asian Games
Universiade medalists in judo
Universiade gold medalists for Japan
Ultimate Fighting Championship male fighters
Medalists at the 1999 Summer Universiade
Sportspeople from Ibaraki Prefecture